Soesilascarites aschnae is a species of beetle in the family Carabidae, the only species in the genus Soesilascarites.

References

Scaritinae